The 2014 Morocco Tennis Tour – Kenitra was a professional tennis tournament played on clay courts. It was the 2nd edition of the tournament which was part of the 2014 ATP Challenger Tour. It took place in Kenitra, Morocco between 22 and 27 September.

Singles main-draw entrants

Seeds

 1 Rankings are as of September 15, 2014.

Other entrants
The following players received wildcards into the singles main draw:
  Amine Ahouda
  Ayoub Chakrouni
  Yassine Idmbarek
  Lamine Ouahab

The following players received entry from the qualifying draw:
  Sandro Ehrat
  Julien Obry
  David Vega Hernández
  Anton Zaitcev

Champions

Singles

  Daniel Gimeno Traver def.  Albert Ramos, 6–3, 6–4

Doubles

  Dino Marcan /  Antonio Šančić def.  Gerard Granollers /  Jordi Samper-Montaña, 6–1, 7–6(7–3)

External links
 Official website

Morocco - Kenitra
Kenitra
Morocco Tennis Tour – Kenitra
Morocco Tennis Tour - Kenitra